The Slide Area is the tenth studio album by Ry Cooder. It was released in 1982 and peaked at #105 on the ''Billboard album chart.

Track listing

Side A
 "UFO Has Landed in the Ghetto" (Ry Cooder, Jim Keltner)
 "I Need a Woman" (Bob Dylan)
 "Gypsy Woman" (Curtis Mayfield)
 "Blue Suede Shoes" (Carl Perkins)

Side B
 "Mama, Don't Treat Your Daughter Mean" (Ry Cooder)
 "I'm Drinking Again" (Ry Cooder, Jim Keltner)
 "Which Came First" (Ry Cooder, Willie Dixon)
 "That's the Way Love Turned Out for Me" (Quinton Claunch, Ry Cooder, Dave Hall)

Reception 
Reviewing the album for AllMusic, Bob Gottlieb said:
Yes, it is a rhythm & blues, bordering at times on funk album, and rap is one direction R&B took, but..... The two gems on this are the phenomenal treatments of both "Blue Suede Shoes" and Bob Dylan's "I Need a Woman." Two songs as different in the original forms as pigs and gerbils are converted to R&B hit status. Both contain some memorable slide guitar work, but isn't that what we expect from this master of the guitar family. The album is very good but those two songs make it a gem.

Personnel

Musicians 
 Ry Cooder – guitar, vocals
 Jim Keltner – drums
 Jim Dickinson – keyboards (A1 – A3, B2, B4); piano (A4); electric piano (B1); organ (B3)
 William D. Smith – keyboards (A1 – A3, B2, B4)
 Tim Drummond - bass guitar (A1 - A2, A4, B1, B3)
 Reggie McBride - bass guitar (B2, B4)
 Chuck Rainey - bass guitar (A3)
 Ras Baboo Pierre – percussion (A3)
 Bobby King – backing vocals (A1 – B1, B3, B4)
 Willie Greene – background vocals (A1 – B1, B3, B4)
 Herman Johnson – backing vocals (A1 – B1, B3, B4)
 John Hiatt – backing vocals (A1 – B1, B3, B4); guitar (B4)
 George McFadden - backing vocals (A4, B1)
 Kazu Matsui - Shakuhachi flute (B1, B3)

Technical
 Mark Ettel – Engineer Assistant
 Mark Linett – Engineer (Santa Monica) (A1, A2, A4, B1, B3)
 Bernie Grundman – mastering
 Allen Sides – mixing (A3, B2, B4)
 Masuru Mera – cover photography
 Ry Cooder – producer
 Leslie Morris – assistant producer

References

Ry Cooder albums
1982 albums
Warner Records albums
Albums produced by Ry Cooder